The South Carolina Department of Education is the state education agency of South Carolina. It is headquartered in Columbia at the Rutledge Building.  The agency is overseen by an elected Superintendent of Education, currently Ellen Weaver. Previous Superintendents have included Molly Spearman, Hugh S. Thompson, Mick Zais, Jim Rex, and Inez Tenenbaum.

Instructional Television
The Department of Education's Instructional Television (SCDE ITV) team, part of the South Carolina Office of eLearning, works with South Carolina Educational Television (ETV) to provide resources and services to South Carolina public schools, including instructional television (ITV) for distance learning. ITV is responsible for the selection of video-based resources, the development of local programming to support the state's K–12 curriculum, and the scheduling of approved resources. ETV provides production and technical delivery services to support instructional programming. K-12 and professional development programming are now delivered both by broadcast through the ETV satellite system and online via StreamlineSC.
ITV has produced with ETV award-winning series including Project Discovery and Eye Wonder. South Carolina focused resources including Detective Bonz, the SC History Mystery and Idella Bodie's SC Women Series are utilized to support the curriculum.

Executive Department

The state superintendent of education is elected at-large and serves a term of four years.

Executive Department positions
Ellen Weaver, State Superintendent
Betsy Carpentier, Deputy, Division of Data, Technology & Agency Operations
Cathy Hazelwood, Deputy and General Counsel, Division of Legal Affairs
John Payne, Deputy, Division of Federal Programs, Accountability & School Improvement
Virgie Chambers, Deputy, Division of District Operations & Support

Board of Education 
The South Carolina State Board of Education is composed of one representative from each of the sixteen South Carolina Judicial Circuit Courts. County representatives for each circuit are responsible for electing their circuit's board representative whose term ends after four consecutive years. Any person who is a registered elector in the State and who has taken the oath of office as defined by the Constitution of South Carolina is eligible for board membership.

Superintendents

References

External links
 South Carolina Department of Education

State departments of education of the United States
Education
South Carolina Educational Television